Kripal or "Kripalu" may refer to:

A. G. Kripal Singh (1933–1987), Indian Test cricketer
Arjan Kripal Singh (born 1969), Indian cricketer
Jeffrey J. Kripal, Professor of Religious Studies at Rice University, Houston, Texas
Kripal Singh Shekhawat (1922–2008), Indian craftsman
Ram Kripal Yadav (born 1957), Indian politician
Kripal Parmar, Indian politician
Kripalu Maharaj
Kripalu Center
Kripalvananda

See also 
Kirpal Singh (disambiguation)
Bhupinder Nath Kirpal
Karpal Singh, Malaysian politician and lawyer